East 181st Avenue station is a MAX light rail station in Gresham, Oregon.  It serves the Blue Line and is the 20th stop eastbound on the eastside MAX line.

The station is at the intersection of NE/SE 181st Avenue and Burnside Street.  This station has staggered side platforms, which sit on either side of the cross street, because the route runs around this station on Burnside Street in the median.  Sterling Bank is by the eastbound platform on Burnside and 181st.

A TriMet park-and-ride lot for this station is available just to the east, at 18324 E. Burnside Street.

The station was located in TriMet fare zone 3 from its opening in 1986 until September 2012, at which time TriMet discontinued all use of zones in its fare structure.

Bus line connections
This station is served by the following bus lines:
25-Glisan/Rockwood
87-Airport Way/181st Ave
In addition, line 20-Burnside/Stark serves stops at 181st and Stark, about four blocks (or 1,000 feet) to the south of the MAX station.

References

External links
 Station information (with westbound ID number) from TriMet
 Station information (with eastbound ID number) from TriMet
 MAX Light Rail Stations – more general TriMet page

MAX Light Rail stations
MAX Blue Line
Buildings and structures in Gresham, Oregon
Railway stations in the United States opened in 1986
Railway stations in Multnomah County, Oregon